Uprising: Who the Hell Said You Can't Ditch and Switch? — The Awakening of Diamond and Silk is a 2020 non-fiction book by Diamond and Silk. The book was released on August 18, 2020, the publisher is Regnery. This is Diamond and Silk's first book to be published. This book has made it onto Publishers Weekly Hardcover Frontlist Non-Fiction Bestsellers ranked at #17 as of August 28, 2020.

Summary
Diamond and Silk's first book talks about their personal life, current events, and the Black Lives Matter movement. The book talks about Diamond and Silk switching parties from Democratic to GOP in 2015 and how they overcame everything that has happened since then. The book also promotes readers and people to be free-thinkers and vote/support who they want to, rather than being coerced/pressured into thinking or voting in a certain way. Diamond and Silk get personal in the book by mentioning how they overcame being poor, being shamed by others, and being victors rather than being victims during their lifetime.

Bribery allegation
In the book, Diamond and Silk stated that they were offered $150,000 USD by an unidentified person to stop supporting Donald Trump and endorse another candidate. Diamond and Silk have called the incident as racially motivated; in Diamond's own words she said: "It’s the stereotype that if a black person is doing something, they must be getting paid for it. What they didn’t realize is that we knew what the Democrats were about. We knew how the Left operated. We weren’t accepting any of it" and Silk added: "None of it. We didn’t tell anybody about this. We didn’t make it public. We’re talking about it right now in our book so that y’all will know what Diamond and Silk have gone through and all of the different things that have come our way, but we continue to stand strong". The alleged bribery attempt was not revealed before the release of the book.

References

2020 non-fiction books
American political books
Books about conservatism
Regnery Publishing books